The 1994 Muratti Time Indoor, known as such for sponsorship reasons, was an ATP men's tennis tournament played on indoor carpet courts at the Assago Forum Milan, Italy that was part of the Championship Series of the 1994 ATP Tour. It was the 17th edition of the tournament and took place from 7 February until 13 February 1994. Fifth-seeded Boris Becker won his second consecutive singles title at the event and his fourth in total and earned $112,500 first-prize money.

Finals

Singles

 Boris Becker defeated  Petr Korda, 6–2, 3–6, 6–3
 It was Becker's 1st singles title of the year and the 39th of his career.

Doubles
 Tom Nijssen /  Cyril Suk defeated  Hendrik Jan Davids /  Piet Norval, 4–6, 7–6, 7–6

References

External links
 ITF tournament edition details

Milan Indoor
 
Milan Indoor
Milan Indoor
Milan Indoor